The Stimson Center, named after American statesman, lawyer, and politician Henry L. Stimson, is a nonprofit, nonpartisan think tank that aims to enhance international peace and security through analysis and outreach. The center's stated approach is pragmatic – seeking to provide policy alternatives, solve problems, and overcome obstacles toward a more peaceful and secure world. Stimson's work addresses a range of global issues, focusing on challenges to peace and prosperity, such as nuclear proliferation, arms trafficking, water management, wildlife poaching, and responses to humanitarian crises. Stimson seeks to provide expertise for the policymaking community – the U.S. executive and legislative branches, international institutions and governments, and policy research institutions – as well as the media, academia, and general public.

In 2013, Stimson received the MacArthur Award for Creative and Effective Institutions. Stimson was ranked 10th best U.S. think tank in the University of Pennsylvania's 2020 Global Go To Think Tanks Report.

History

The Stimson Center was founded in 1989 by Barry Blechman and Michael Krepon. It is currently led by Chairman of the Board Herbert "Hawk" Carlisle. and President and CEO Brian Finlay.

The center is funded by research contracts, grants from foundations and other donations. It publicly discloses funding sources on an annual basis.

Programs and Areas of Research
The Stimson Center conducts research, engagement, and solutions building across five thematic areas: Trade and Technology, Security and Strategy, Human Security and Governance, Climate and Natural Resources, and Pivotal Places, a geographic topic that largely covers work on Asia and the Indo-Pacific. 

The organization has about twenty different policy programs, including:

38 North 
The 38 North program cultivates public policy debate about North Korea, emphasizing hands-on experience and expertise with the authoritative 38north.org web journal, in-depth research on issues central to North Korean strategic thinking, and informal diplomatic engagement. Other major projects include North Korea's Economy: A Glimpse Through Imagery, a commercial satellite imagery analysis series focused on the North Korean economy in partnership with the National Geospatial-Intelligence Agency, and the DPRK Digital Atlas, a comprehensive geospatial dataset based on open source data of DPRK political, economic, cultural and security infrastructure.

East Asia
The East Asia program conducts research on regional security issues and offers recommendations for policymakers in the U.S. and in the region on a variety of issues. The program analyzes the dynamics of cross-Strait relations, including the exchange of ideas and people between the U.S. and Asia-Pacific region. The program also examines China's foreign relations toward Northeast and Southeast Asia, with a special focus on Myanmar, Iran, and Africa, and addresses U.S.–Japan alliance relations and developments on the Korean Peninsula.

Environmental Security
The Environmental Security program explores how increased stress on global ecosystems and shared natural resources may compromise economic development, fuel social conflict, and undermine political stability in key areas throughout the world. Through collaborative stakeholder engagement, Stimson works to provide policy-relevant analysis, promote useful knowledge-sharing, build partnerships, and forge pragmatic policy solutions that ensure the sustainable management of shared natural resources and the mitigation of environmental risks.

Middle East
The Middle East program explores issues that affect regional security from the Mediterranean to the Persian Gulf. Stimson scholars are working on cross-border dynamics in the region, and are focused on the rising threat from sectarianism and its roots in radical Islamic ideology, looking at key countries and at regional consequences. The program's Gulf Security work analyzes traditional and nontraditional security issues impacting the Gulf States and their neighbors. In 2015, the program is monitoring the regional security repercussions of the Iran nuclear negotiations.

South Asia
The South Asia program seeks to reduce nuclear dangers in South Asia by focusing on risks associated with the accelerating arms competition between India and Pakistan. These risks are amplified by the activities of terrorist groups and political instability in the region. The program has championed confidence-building and nuclear risk-reduction measures in South Asia for over twenty years. The South Asia program analyzes U.S. crisis management on the subcontinent, producing case studies of the “Twin Peaks” and Mumbai crises, and identifying future challenges. The program seeks to empower an emerging generation of strategic analysts in South Asia by means of the South Asian Voices website, conferences, and visiting fellowships.

Southeast Asia

The Southeast Asia program addresses major challenges facing the region today, ranging from the food-water-energy security nexus in the Mekong Basin to political and economic issues of Association of Southeast Asian Nations (ASEAN) integration. The main focus of the program's research is development in the Greater Mekong Subregion, particularly hydroelectric power projects and their impacts on the food-water-security nexus and regional stability. The program also regularly addresses trade, economic, and political issues involving ASEAN member states, U.S.–ASEAN relations and policy issues, and maritime security issues in the South China Sea, particularly territorial disputes and fishery management.

Publications
A selection of recent publications includes:
 "Confronting the Crisis of Global Governance" – A report from the Commission on Global Security, Justice and Governance that details a practical action plan for innovating global governance, as well as offering ways to mobilize diverse actors to advance reform to better respond to 21st century threats, challenges, and opportunities.
 "Recommendations and Report of the Task Force on US Drone Policy" – This report details recommendations for overhauling UAV strategy, improving oversight, accountability and transparency, developing forward-looking international norms relating to the use of lethal force in nontraditional settings, and devising sound UAV export control and research and development policies.
 "A New US Defense Strategy for a New Era: Military Superiority, Agility and Efficiency" – This report sets out ten key operating principles that emphasize greater efficiency and effectiveness throughout the Defense Department and finds that a successful defense strategy could be achieved at budget levels significantly lower than present.

Accomplishments
 Ranked 10th of the "Top Think Tanks in the United States"  in the University of Pennsylvania's "2020 Global Go To Think Tank Index Report".
 Winner of the MacArthur Foundation’s Award for Creative and Effective Institutions in 2013.
 Given 5-Star (Highly Transparent) rating by Transparify’s 2015 report, "How Transparent are Think Tanks about Who Funds Them 2015?"

Key people
 Brian Finlay (President & CEO, 2015–Present)
 Herbert "Hawk" Carlisle (Chairman, 2022–Present)
 Barry Blechman (Co-Founder/Emeritus, 1989–Present, Chairman 1989–2007, Board 2014–Present)
 Michael Krepon (Co-Founder/Emeritus, 1989–2022)

Board of Directors

Kris M. Balderston (General Manager of FleishmanHillard, former legislative director to Senator Hillary Clinton) (2016–Present)
John B. Bellinger, III (Former Legal Adviser for the U.S. Department of State) (2017–Present)
Lincoln P. Bloomfield, Jr. (Former Ambassador) (Emeritus, 2005–Present)
Kenneth C. Brill (Retired Ambassador) (2012–Present)
Susan Chodakewitz (Nathan Associates, Inc.) (2015–Present)
Lansing Crane (Crane & Company) (1995-2007)
Bowman Cutter (Roosevelt Institute) (2016–Present)
Lori Fisler Damrosch (Columbia Law School) (2014–Present)
Alton Frye (Emeritus, 1990–Present)
Robert Gallucci (retired U.S. Diplomat)
Gary R. Gregg (Retired insurance executive) (2012–Present)
Francis Q Hoang (Momentum Aviation Group) (2015–Present)
Michelle Howard (retired U.S. Navy Admiral)
Leslie Ireland (Former Assistant Secretary of the Treasury) (2017–Present)
Andrea Koppel (Mercy Corps) (2008–Present)
Brett B. Lambert (Former Deputy Assistant Secretary of Defense) (2014–Present)
Alice Maroni (Pension Benefit Guaranty Corporation) (2011–Present)
Richard Morrissey (Sullivan & Cromwell LLP)
John V. Parachini (RAND Corporation) (2016–Present)
Nicole Piasecki (Boeing Commercial Airplanes) (2016–Present)
Thomas R. Pickering (Former Ambassador) (Emeritus, 2001–Present)
Zack Porter (Proteus Environmental Technologies) (2016–Present)
Mary Speiser (Former intelligence analyst) (2016–Present)
Fred Whitridge, Jr. (Archipelago Corporation) (2013–Present)

Former Board Members

Duane Andrews (retired CEO, Qinetiq North America) (2014–Present)
Les Aspin (1994–1995)
Zoë Baird (1990–1991)
Charles Bailey II (Emeritus, 1991–2004)
Courtney Banks Spaeth (Growth) (2014–Present)
Linda Banton (2001–2010)
Retired US Navy Vice Admiral Kevin J. Cosgriff (Vice Chairman)
Andrew J. Czekaj (Cambridge Holdings) (2012–Present)
Barbara Davis Blum (2001–2010)
Avis Bohlen (2004–2013)
K. David Boyer (2001–2002)
Richard Clarke (1997–2010)
Elmer Cooper (1991–1995)
Carlos Del Toro (SBG Technology Solutions) (2019-2021)
William Harrop (2001–2011)
W. Bradford Gary (2010-2013)
Arnold Kanter (1994–2005)
Farooq Kathwari (2003–2014)
Peter Lavoy (2014)
Roger Leeds (1990–2005)
Frank Loy (1990–1998, 2002–2005)
Jane Holl Lute (2013–2014)
Leo Mackay, Jr. (Director, 1998–2001)
Norman P. Neureiter (2005–2012)
Kathleen Newland (Migration Policy Institute)
Philip Odeen (2001–2014)
Anne Richard (2006–2011)
Condoleezza Rice (1991–2001)
Rozanne L. Ridgway (1997–2001)
Enid Schoettle (1992–2010)
Jeffrey Smith (1990–2010)
Leonard Spector (1989–1997)
Howard Stoertz (1991–1997)
Richard Thornburgh (1994–1997)
Larry Welch (1997–2009)
Carroll Wetzel (2000–2011)
John Wickham (1992–1998)
Susan Williams (1990–2002)
Willard Wirtz (1991–1993)
Robert O. Boorstin (2007–2015)
Laurie S. Fulton (2014–2016)
Jean-Francois Seznec (2009–2016)

See also
 38 NorthA weblog focusing on North Korea in the Stimson Center

References

External links

The Henry L. Stimson Center

 
Non-profit organizations based in Washington, D.C.
Political and economic think tanks in the United States
Foreign policy and strategy think tanks in the United States
1989 establishments in the United States
Think tanks established in 1989